The UEFA European Championship is the primary national association football tournament in Europe. The sixteen completed tournaments have been won by ten national teams: Germany and Spain have each won three titles, France and Italy have each won two titles, and the Soviet Union, Czechoslovakia, the Netherlands, Denmark, Greece and Portugal have each won one title. The role of the manager is to select the squad for the European Championship and develop the tactics of the team. Pressure is attached to the role due to the significance of winning the competition and the lack of day-to-day contact with players during the regular club season aside from international breaks.

Gavriil Kachalin led the Soviet Union to victory in the inaugural tournament in 1960. No manager has won the title on more than one occasion, and all winning managers have won it with their native countries, with the exception of German coach Otto Rehhagel leading Greece to victory in 2004. Two managers have both won and lost a European Championship final: Helmut Schön (winner in 1972 and runner-up in 1976, both with West Germany) and Berti Vogts (winner in 1996 and runner-up in 1992, both with Germany). Vogts is also the only person to win the European Championship as both a player and a manager, having previously lifted the trophy while playing for West Germany in 1972. Schön and Vicente del Bosque are the only managers to have won the European Championship and World Cup; Schön managed Germany to the 1974 World Cup after winning the European Championship in 1972 and del Bosque led Spain to victory in the 2010 World Cup before winning the European Championship in 2012.

José Villalonga is the youngest manager to win the trophy, he was 44 years and 192 days old when he led Spain to victory in 1964. The oldest manager to win the European Championship is Luis Aragonés, who was 69 years and 336 days old when Spain won in 2008. Joachim Löw and Lars Lagerbäck jointly hold the record for managing at the most European Championships, with both leading teams at four different tournaments; Löw additionally holds the records for most matches managed (21) and most matches won (12) in the competition, all coming between the 2008 and 2020 tournaments.

Winning managers

By nationality

References

Lists of association football managers